Aaja Mexico Challiye is a 2022 Indian Punjabi-language thriller drama film directed by Rakesh Dhawan starring Ammy Virk, Nasir Chinyoti and Yasaman Mohsani.

Plot 

The story of this film revolves around Ammy Virk's character Pamma and his voyage to enter the United States by crossing the jungles of Mexico unbeknownst to the risks of the journey.

Cast 
Ammy Virk as Parminder "Pamma" Singh
Nasir Chinyoti as Waqaar
Zafri Khan as Guddu
Sukhwinder Chahal as Pamma's father
Honey Mattu as Jerry
Mintu Kappa as Makkhan
Yasaman Mohsani as Yaza
Baljinder Kaur as Pamma's mother
Aman Kaur Deer as Satwant, Pamma's sister

Soundtrack

Release and reception 
The film premiered in Dubai on 24 February 2022.

Neha Vashisht of The Times of India gave the film a rating of four out of five stars wrote that "A big shout out to the writer and director of the movie Rakesh Dhawan, who has come up with such a brave concept. He has also done the dialogues and the screenplay of the movie, which has kept the whole plot together. The jokes and punches in the movie are simply effortless and will make you laugh instantly. At the same time, when it comes to the portrayal of heavy emotions, the movie has the power to leave you with teary eyes". Sukhpreeth Kahlon of Cinestaan opined that "The performances are adequate and the cinematography captures the vastness of the landscape and the ordeal of the migrants. However, in its zeal to depict hardships, the film becomes a protracted drama, especially in the second half".

References

External links 
 
 

2020s Punjabi-language films
2022 films
2022 thriller drama films
Films shot in the United Kingdom
Punjabi-language Indian films